André Laurent (born 14 February 1931) is a Belgian former swimmer. He competed in the men's 100 metre freestyle at the 1956 Summer Olympics. He also competed in the water polo tournament at the 1952 Summer Olympics and the 1964 Summer Olympics.

References

External links
 

1931 births
Possibly living people
Belgian male water polo players
Olympic swimmers of Belgium
Olympic water polo players of Belgium
Swimmers at the 1956 Summer Olympics
Water polo players at the 1952 Summer Olympics
Water polo players at the 1964 Summer Olympics
Place of birth missing (living people)
Belgian male freestyle swimmers
20th-century Belgian people